John Walter Clark (born 1935), is Wayman Crow Professor of Physics emeritus at Washington University in St. Louis, and a recipient of the Eugene Feenberg Medal in 1987 for his contributions to many-body theory.

Biography 
John Clark was born in 1935 in Lockhart, Texas. He received his BS and MA degrees in physics from the University of Texas at Austin in 1955 and 1957, respectively. He then earned his Ph.D. in Physics under the supervision of Eugene Feenberg at Washington University in St. Louis in 1959. He was an National Science Foundation Postdoctoral Fellow at Princeton University advised by Eugene Wigner and a NATO postdoctoral fellow at University of Birmingham and Saclay from 1959 to 1963. He named his son Eugene after his advisors. Author  is his daughter.

He became an assistant professor of physics at Washington University in 1963, was department chair from 2002-2007, and succeeded Edwin T. Jaynes as the Wayman Crow Professor of Physics.

Research and teaching 
Clark is notable for his contributions to nuclear physics and many-body theory, but later in his career also turned his interests to neural nets. He taught "Physics of the Brain" for many years. He supervised over two dozen Ph.D. students and was notable for promoting women in the field.

Awards 

 Fellow, American Physical Society
 Alfred P. Sloan Foundation Fellowship (1965)
Eugene Feenberg Medal for Many-Body Physics (1987)
 Wayman Crow Professorship in Physics (1999)

References 

1935 births
Living people
Washington University in St. Louis alumni
Washington University in St. Louis faculty
Washington University physicists
Physicists from Missouri
Scientists from Missouri
American physicists
American nuclear physicists
Fellows of the American Physical Society